How Long Has This Been Going On is the twenty-fourth studio album by Northern Irish singer-songwriter Van Morrison, "with Georgie Fame and Friends", released in December 1995 (see 1995 in music) in the UK.  It charted at No. 1 on Top Jazz Albums.

Recording history
The album was recorded live (but without an audience) at Ronnie Scott's Jazz Club, London, England, on 3 May 1995, and features a number of jazz standards and a be-bop influenced rendition of Morrison's classic "Moondance". According to Van Morrison, "the album took four or five hours to record and Ronnie Scott's was chosen for the vibe." Georgie Fame recalled that the album came about after he and Morrison had discussed it for several years when, "I got the band together, and we ran through some ideas one quiet afternoon...that went very well, so Van said, 'Let's do it.'"

Songs
Pee Wee Ellis played saxophone and also served as arranger, along with Fame, Morrison and saxophonist Leo Green. There were more cover songs on this album than usual with Morrison's albums. Annie Ross appeared on  "Blues Backstage" and also on the song, "Centerpiece". This song is also featured on the 2007 compilation album, The Best of Van Morrison Volume 3, along with "Moondance" and "That's Life".  "Heathrow Shuffle" is an instrumental composition from the 70's that was brought back on this album.  Morrison had performed this song when he played at the Montreux Jazz Festival in 1974, and it is included on his 2006 DVD, Live at Montreux 1980/1974.

Reviews

The reviews for the album were mixed with the American critics more favourable.   The Daily Telegraph said, "Van huffs and puffs where he should whisper," while Rolling Stone stated, "It's an old blues trick – laughing in the face of trouble – but Morrison does it with such contagious enthusiasm, it sounds fresh again."

Track listing
"I Will Be There" (Van Morrison) – 2:30 
"The New Symphony Sid" (King Pleasure, Lester Young: additional lyrics Georgie Fame) – 3:53
"Early in the Morning" (Dallas Bartley, Leo Hickman, Louis Jordan) – 2:44
"Who Can I Turn To (When Nobody Needs Me)" (Leslie Bricusse, Anthony Newley) – 4:02
"Sack O' Woe" (Cannonball Adderley, Jon Hendricks) – 4:06
"Moondance" (Morrison) – 7:18 
"Centerpiece" (Harry Edison, Hendricks), including section from "Blues Backstage" (Frank Foster) – 4:08 
"How Long Has This Been Going On?" (George Gershwin, Ira Gershwin) – 3:49 
"Your Mind Is on Vacation" (Mose Allison) – 3:06 
"All Saint's Day" (Morrison) – 2:19 
"Blues in the Night" (Harold Arlen, Johnny Mercer) – 3:22 
"Don't Worry About a Thing" (Allison) – 2:22 
"That's Life" (Dean Kay, Kelly Gordon) – 3:52 
"Heathrow Shuffle" (Morrison) – 3:18

Tracks 2, 5, 7, 8, 10 & 12 arranged by Georgie Fame.
Tracks 3, 4, 9 & 13 arranged by Pee Wee Ellis.
Tracks 6 & 14 arranged by Van Morrison.
Track 1 arranged by Leo Green.
Track 11 arranged by Georgie Fame and Pee Wee Ellis.

Personnel
Van Morrison – vocals, alto saxophone
Georgie Fame – vocals, Hammond organ
Annie Ross – vocals
Pee Wee Ellis – alto saxophone
Alan Skidmore – alto saxophone
Leo Green – tenor saxophone
Guy Barker – trumpet
Robin Aspland – piano
Alec Dankworth – double bass
Ralph Salmins – drums

Charts

Notes

References
Heylin, Clinton (2003). Can You Feel the Silence? Van Morrison: A New Biography,  Chicago Review Press 
Hinton, Brian (1997). Celtic Crossroads: The Art of Van Morrison, Sanctuary, 

Van Morrison albums
1995 albums
Mercury Records albums
Albums produced by Van Morrison
Albums recorded at Ronnie Scott's Jazz Club